Volvo – The Game is a free racing simulation video game for Microsoft Windows, developed by SimBin Studios (later Sector3 Studios) and released in May 2009. When the game launched Volvo also organized an online competition. The winner got a set of Pirelli tires.

History 
The game was released on May 26, 2009. It was developed with the intention of showcasing the interior and exterior of Volvo cars, and as such was released free of charge.

Gameplay
Volvo – The Game includes six cars from Volvo and two race tracks. Cars include the Volvo C30, S60, S40, 850 and the 240 Turbo Group A. The race tracks are the Gothenburg Eco Drive Arena and Chayka.
 
The player can choose between racing with other opponents or racing alone against a record time for one lap.

The game was sponsored by Pirelli, who are the in-game tire manufacturer.

Reception 
The game was praised for its graphics and drivers' seat view, but criticised for only having two racing tracks.

References

External links
 Official website (archived)
 
 

2009 video games
Advergames
Freeware games
Racing simulators
Racing video games
SimBin Studios games
Video games developed in Sweden
Video games set in Sweden
Video games set in Ukraine
Volvo Cars
Windows games
Windows-only games